Dave Pember is a former Major League Baseball pitcher. Pember was drafted by the Milwaukee Brewers in the eighth round of the 1999 Major League Baseball Draft. He played with the team at the Major League level in 2002.

Pember played at the collegiate level at Western Carolina University. In 1998, he played collegiate summer baseball with the Orleans Cardinals of the Cape Cod Baseball League.

References

Milwaukee Brewers players
Major League Baseball pitchers
Western Carolina Catamounts baseball players
1974 births
Living people
Baseball players from Cincinnati
Orleans Firebirds players
Beloit Snappers players
High Desert Mavericks players
Huntsville Stars players